The Strathkelvin and Bearsden by-election, 2001 was a by-election held for the Scottish Parliament constituency of Strathkelvin and Bearsden on 7 June 2001, the same day as the UK general election and also a Scottish Parliament by-election in Banff and Buchan. It was caused by the resignation for health reasons of the constituency's MSP, Sam Galbraith.

The Labour Party retained the seat with Brian Fitzpatrick winning for them.  He faced a strong challenge from Dr. Jean Turner who stood as an "independent" candidate trying to save the local Stobhill Hospital.  Turner would later stand against Fitzpatrick at the 2003 election for the Scottish Parliament and defeat him.

Result

Scottish Parliament Election result, 1999

See also
Strathkelvin and Bearsden (Scottish Parliament constituency)
Elections in Scotland
List of by-elections to the Scottish Parliament

External links
Scottish Election Results 1997 - present

Strathkelvin and Bearsden by-election
2000s elections in Scotland
Politics of East Dunbartonshire
Strathkelvin and Bearsden by-election
Strathkelvin and Bearsden 2001
21st century in East Dunbartonshire
Strathkelvin and Bearsden by-election